Walkerburn Rugby Football Club are a rugby union side in the small village of Walkerburn in the Borders, Scotland.

Walkerburn Sevens
The club organise the annual Walkerburn Sevens tournament. It is the finale of the Border Sevens Circuit; being the last Sevens tournament of the season. It is known as the Prince of the Sevens.

Honours
Walkerburn Sevens
 Champions (11): 1911, 1912, 1914, 1923, 1925, 1927, 1928, 1930, 1934, 1936, 1966
Peebles Sevens
 Champions (7): 1923, 1925, 1928, 1930, 1931, 1934, 1950

References

Scottish rugby union teams
Rugby union clubs in the Scottish Borders
Rugby clubs established in 1884
1884 establishments in Scotland